Murphy Joseph Mahoney (born 27 December 2001) is an English professional footballer who plays as a goalkeeper for Championship club Queens Park Rangers.

Club career
Starting his career with local side, Caversham AFC, Mahoney joined Queens Park Rangers in 2012, following a two-year spell at Wycombe Wanderers prior to their academy closing. During the 2021–22 campaign, Mahoney spent time on loan in the National League South with Welling United and Bath City before eventually joining Stratford Town over the Christmas period. Upon his return to West London, he went onto make his debut for the club during a 2–1 away defeat to Preston North End, stepping in for the injured Kieren Westwood.

On 28 June 2022, Mahoney signed a new two-year deal with QPR, keeping him with the club until 2024.

Career statistics

References

External links

2001 births
Living people
English footballers
Association football goalkeepers
Wycombe Wanderers F.C. players
Queens Park Rangers F.C. players
Welling United F.C. players
Bath City F.C. players
Stratford Town F.C. players
National League (English football) players
Southern Football League players
English Football League players